The 2023 VFL Women's season is the seventh season of the VFL Women's (VFLW). The season will commence on 25 March and conclude with the grand final on 30 July.  are the defending premiers.

Clubs

Note: The Hawthorn Football Club transferred their VFL Women's license to Box Hill during the off-season, replicating the club's men's team reserves arrangement in the Australian Football League and Victorian Football League.

Ladder

Finals series
Match-ups set using the second McIntyre final six system.

Qualifying and elimination finals

Semi finals

Preliminary final

Grand Final

References

External links
 Official website

 
V